Miss World Philippines 2011 was the 1st edition of the Miss World Philippines pageant under a new organization. It was held at the Philippine International Convention Center in Pasay, Metro Manila, Philippines on September 18, 2011.  

At the end of the event, Miss World 2010, Alexandra Mills crowned Gwendoline Gaelle Sandrine Ruais as the first Miss World Philippines. Helen Nicolette Henson was named as First Princess, Martha Chloe McCulley as Second Princess, Maria Paula Bianca Paz as Third Princess, and Jaysel Arrozal as Fourth Princess.

Ruais went on to place as 1st Princess and awarded as Asia and Oceania Continental Queen at the Miss World 2011 pageant held on November 6, 2011 in London, United Kingdom.

Results
Color key
  The contestant was a Runner-up in an International pageant.

Special Awards

Judges 
 Wilma Galvante - GMA Network Senior Vice President for Entertainment
 Victoria G. Belo, M.D.  - Medical Director of the Belo Medical Group
 Maria Cristina Roco Corona - Spouse of Renato C. Corona, 23rd Chief Justice, Supreme Court of the Philippines
 Iza Calzado - International actress, TV host, model and GMA Network contract artist 
 Fanny Serrano - Fashion and beauty industry expert and President of the Philippine International Cosmetologists Association (PICA)
 Manny Pacquiao, PLH - Congressman of the lone district of Sarangani and WBO Welterweight World Champion (Super Champion)
 Carl McClean - Chairman, Superbrand Marketing International Inc.
 Cramer Ball - Regional General Manager (Asia Pacific South & Australasia), Etihad Airways
 Joseph Calata - Chairman and CEO, Calata Corporation

Contestants
25 contestants competed for the title.

Notes

Prizes 

 Miss World Philippines 2011 wins ₱1,000,000 cash tax-free, a brand new SMDC condominium unit, GMA management contract, and the right to represent the country in the Miss World 2011.

Post-pageant Notes 

 Gwendoline Ruais competed at Miss World 2011 in London and was named 1st Runner-Up. Ruais also won the Continental Queen of Asia title. After her stint in Miss World, Ruais joined the fourth season of Asia's Next Top Model where she placed eleventh. 
 Elaine Kay Moll and Rogelie Catacutan competed at Binibining Pilipinas 2012 and Binibining Pilipinas 2015, respectively. Moll was named 1st Runner-Up and was appointed as Binibining Pilipinas Supranational 2012, while Catacutan was crowned Binibining Pilipinas Supranational 2015. Moll was named 3rd Runner-Up when she competed in Miss Supranational 2012, while Catacutan was one of the twenty semifinalists when she competed in 2015.

References

External links
 Official Website

2011
2011 beauty pageants
2011 in the Philippines